Marie Elisabeth of Hesse-Darmstadt (11 March 1656, Darmstadt – 16 August 1715, Römhild) was the only Duchess by marriage of Saxe-Römhild.

Early life
Princess Marie Elisabeth was daughter of Louis VI, Landgrave of Hesse-Darmstadt (1630–1678) from his marriage to Princess Maria Elisabeth of Holstein-Gottorp (1634–1665), a daughter of Duke Frederick III, Duke of Holstein-Gottorp.

Married life
On 1 March 1676 in Darmstadt, she married Henry, Duke of Saxe-Römhild, who at the time of the marriage ruled Saxe-Gotha jointly with his six brothers.
In 1680, they divided the country and Henry became the Duke of Saxe-Römhild. He had resided there since 1676, in Glücksburg Castle in Römhild. After Henry's death, a dispute erupted among his remaining brothers over the inheritance of Saxe-Römhild. This dispute was settled definitively in 1765.

Henry loved his wife very much.  He always called her "Marielies", and had several luxurious buildings built in her honor, including a cave house called "Marie Elisabeth Delight". They had no children. Henry died in 1710, leaving a massive debt. Marie Elizabeth survived her husband by five years.

Sources
 Association of Saxe-Meiningen history and cultural studies (ed.): New Geography of the duchy of Saxe-Meiningen, Hildburghausen 1903

External links
 http://www.thepeerage.com/p706.htm#i7058

Marie Elisabeth
1656 births
1715 deaths
Daughters of monarchs